Bashawi  is a Syrian village located in Wadi al-Uyun Nahiyah in Masyaf District, Hama.  According to the Syria Central Bureau of Statistics (CBS), Bashawi had a population of 253 in the 2004 census.

References 

Populated places in Masyaf District